Pasha Kola-ye Arbabi (also Romanized as Pāshā Kolā-ye Arbābī; also known as Pāshā Kolā-ye Bābī) is a village in Esfivard-e Shurab Rural District, in the Central District of Sari County, Mazandaran Province, Iran. At the 2006 census, its population was 749, in 198 families.

References 

Populated places in Sari County